Ernst Edvard Rosenqvist (24 August 1869 – 27 May 1932) was a Finnish sport shooter who competed in the 1912 Summer Olympics.

He was part of the Finnish team, which won the bronze medal in the 100 metre running deer, single shots event. He also competed in the 100 metre running deer, single shots event and finished 14th.

References

External links
profile

1869 births
1932 deaths
Finnish male sport shooters
Running target shooters
Shooters at the 1912 Summer Olympics
Olympic shooters of Finland
Olympic bronze medalists for Finland
Olympic medalists in shooting
Medalists at the 1912 Summer Olympics
Sportspeople from Helsinki